Lars-Matti Berenett (born 10 August 1971) is a Swedish actor.

Berenett studied at Calle Flygares teaterskola in Stockholm. Until he became an actor he worked as chimney sweep and coach. He has also played football for Spårvägen in the 1st division. He has also been active on the 3rd division (in IFK Stockholm). Berenett plays also in Hammarby's tuning handball team. Matti Berenett is son to the actors Lars-Erik Berenett and Evabritt Strandberg. Matti Berenett has two daughters.

Filmography

Film

Television

References

External links

Swedish male actors
1971 births
Living people
Spårvägens FF players
IFK Stockholm players
Association footballers not categorized by position
Swedish footballers